Punjab Pradesh Congress Committee (or Punjab PCC), formerly known as the Punjab Provincial Congress Committee in colonial India, is the affiliate of the Indian National Congress in the state of Punjab. On 9 April 2022, Amrinder Singh Raja Warring was appointed by the national leadership of Congress as the chief of Congress in Punjab.  He is a  25th president to hold the post. Present general secretary in-charge of Punjab Pradesh Congress Committee is Harish Chaudhary who was appointed on 22 October 2021

Structure and Composition 
{| class="sortable" cellspacing="0" cellpadding="2" style="border-collapse: collapse; border: 2px #000000 solid; font-size: x-big; width:70%; border:1"
|- style="background-color:#00BFFF; color:white"
! S.No. !! Name !! Designation !! Incharge
|-
| 01 ||Amrinder Singh Raja Warring ||

President
| Punjab Pradesh Congress
|-
| 02 ||Bharat Bhushan Ashu ||Working President|| Punjab Pradesh Congress
|-
| 03 || Pawan Goel ||Working President|| Punjab Pradesh Congress
|-
|04 || Kuljit Singh Nagra ||Working President|| Punjab Pradesh Congress
|-
|05 ||Aruna Chaudhary||Vice President|| Punjab Pradesh Congress
|-
|06 ||Inderbir Singh Bolria||Vice President|| Punjab Pradesh Congress
|-
|07 ||Kushaldeep Singh Kiki Dhillon||Vice President|| Punjab Pradesh Congress
|-
|08 ||Pargat Singh||Vice President|| Punjab Pradesh Congress
|-
|09 ||Sunder Sham Arora||Vice President|| Punjab Pradesh Congress
|-
|10 ||Sandeep Singh Sandhu||General Secretary|| Punjab Pradesh Congress
|-
|}

List of Chief Ministers of Punjab from Indian National Congress

List of Deputy Chief Ministers of Punjab from Indian National Congress

 List of Former Presidents 

 Performance in Elections 

 Pre-Independence Punjab Legislative CouncilPunjab Legislative Assembly'''

Post-Independence 

 ^ - Party didn't contest election
 ~ - Party didn't exist
 - Green color box indicates the party/parties who formed the government
 - Red color box indicates the official opposition party

See also 
 All India Congress Committee
 Pradesh Congress Committee

References

External links

Politics of Punjab, India
Indian National Congress by state or union territory